Plum Branch is a stream in St. Francois County in the U.S. state of Missouri. It is a tributary of Back Creek.

Plum Branch most likely was so named on account of plum trees in the area.

See also
List of rivers of Missouri

References

Rivers of St. Francois County, Missouri
Rivers of Missouri